Alexander Myint San Aung Aris (born 12 April 1973) is the elder son of Aung San Suu Kyi and Michael Aris. He is also a grandson of Aung San, who is credited with achieving the independence of Myanmar (although he was assassinated in 1947, six months before the independence). He has been representing his mother, who has been detained by the military junta for years; he accepted the Nobel Peace Prize for her, and on many other awards and occasions, he has represented her.

Early life
Aris was born on 12 April 1973 at Queen Charlotte's and Chelsea Hospital in Hammersmith, London to Aung San Suu Kyi and Michael Aris. His younger brother Kim Aris was born in 1977. His family home was in Park Town, North Oxford. In March 1988, his mother returned to Burma in order to nurse her dying mother Daw Khin Kyi, the wife of Aung San. She did not return to Oxford until June 2012, having been placed under house arrest in Burma for political reasons in 1989.

Education
Aris was educated at two private schools in his home city of Oxford: at Dragon School, a co-educational preparatory school, followed by Magdalen College School, a senior school for boys, which he left in 1990. He graduated from Northern Illinois University in the United States and received a MSc in Mathematical Sciences.

Life after mother's detention
In 1989, Alexander and his brother Kim were both stripped of their Burmese citizenships by the ruling junta (military government). The two brothers are British nationals. In 1988 when Kim Aris was only 11 his mother had to leave their home in Oxford to look after her dying mother in Burma.

In 1991, Alexander's mother Aung San Suu Kyi won the Nobel Peace Prize for her efforts in Burma. At the time, Alexander Aris (age 18) and his brother Kim Aris (age 14) accepted the prize on their mother's behalf. The Nobel Peace Prize's 1.3 million USD prize money was used to establish a health and education trust for the Burmese people. Over the years, Aris has accepted many awards and given many speeches on behalf of his mother. They include accepting The Award of the International Human Rights Law Group; welcoming the arrival of the Olympic Torch in Spain; and accepting the Presidential Medal of Freedom in the US.

After his father's death in 1999, Aris visited his mother for a short time.

References

External links
 Alexander's Acceptance Speech of the Nobel Prize

1973 births
Living people
People from London
British people of Burmese descent
British people of Canadian descent
British Theravada Buddhists
People educated at The Dragon School
People educated at Magdalen College School, Oxford
British human rights activists
British pacifists
British democracy activists
British civil rights activists
Aung San Suu Kyi
Family of Aung San